Pyeonghwa-ro is an road located in Gyeonggi Province and Gangwon Province, South Korea.

Stopovers 

 Gyeonggi Province
 Uijeongbu – Yangju – Dongducheon – Yeoncheon County
 Gangwon Province
 Cheorwon County

List of Facilities 
 IS: Intersection, IC: Interchange

Gyeonggi Province

Gangwon Province

References 

Roads in Gangwon
Roads in Gyeonggi